Jan Březina (born 14 April 1954 in Konice)
is a Czech politician and Member of the European Parliament with KDU-ČSL, part of the European People's Party and sits on the European Parliament's Committee on Industry, Research and Energy.  He was elected for Christian Democratic Union - Czechoslovak People's Party, but left the party in February 2012.

He is a substitute for the Committee on Regional Development and a member of the
Delegation for relations with the countries of south-east Europe.

Education
 1978: Master's degree in mining (VŠB Technical University of Ostrava)

Career
 since 1990: Member of KDU-ČSL (Christian Democratic Union - Czechoslovak People's Party)
 since 1995: Member of a district committee of KDU-ČSL
 since 2000: Member of the board of KDU-ČSL
 since 2000: Member of the KDU-ČSL national conference
 since 2000: Member of the KDU-ČSL national committee
 1995-1997: Deputy Mayor of Uničov
 1997-2000: Chief Executive of Olomouc District Office
 2000-2004: Member of the Regional Assembly of the Olomouc Region and President of the Olomouc Region
 2000-2004: Joint Committee with the EU Committee of the Regions
 2004: Member of the Committee of the Regions
 since 1998: Participated in the drafting of the Czech Republic's strategy papers

See also
 2004 European Parliament election in the Czech Republic

Footnotes

External links
 
 
 

MEPs for the Czech Republic 2004–2009
MEPs for the Czech Republic 2009–2014
KDU-ČSL MEPs
1954 births
Living people
People from Konice
Technical University of Ostrava alumni